Pelophylax tenggerensis is a species of frog in the  family Ranidae. It is endemic to China. It is recorded from Shapotou and Shenjiatan, Yinnan Prefecture, Ningxia Hui Autonomous Region, along the banks of the Yellow River at the edge of the Tengger Desert, China.

Its natural habitats are temperate grassland, rivers, freshwater marshes, intermittent freshwater marshes, freshwater springs, and arable land. It is threatened by habitat loss.

References

Amphibians of China
Pelophylax
Amphibians described in 1988
Taxonomy articles created by Polbot
Taxa named by Zhao Ermi
Endangered Fauna of China